Joseph Laniel (12 October 18898 April 1975) was a French conservative politician of the Fourth Republic, who served as Prime Minister for a year from 1953 to 1954. During the middle of his tenure as Prime Minister Laniel was an unsuccessful candidate for the French Presidency, a post won by René Coty.

Co-founder of the Republican Party of Liberty (PRL), then of the National Center of Independents and Peasants (CNIP), Laniel's cabinet was overturned after the French defeat at Dien Bien Phu in Indochina in 1954. He was succeeded by Pierre Mendès France.

Laniel's Ministry, 28 June 1953 – 19 June 1954
Joseph Laniel – President of the Council
Henri Queuille – Vice President of the Council
Paul Reynaud – Vice President of the Council
Pierre-Henri Teitgen – Vice President of the Council
Georges Bidault – Minister of Foreign Affairs
René Pleven – Minister of National Defense and Armed Forces
Léon Martinaud-Déplat – Minister of the Interior
Edgar Faure – Minister of Finance and Economic Affairs
Jean-Marie Louvel – Minister of Commerce and Industry
Paul Bacon – Minister of Labour and Social Security
Paul Ribeyre – Minister of Justice
André Marie – Minister of National Education
André Mutter – Minister of Veterans and War Victims
Louis Jacquinot – Minister of Overseas France
Jacques Chastellain – Minister of Public Works, Transport, and Tourism
Paule Coste-Floret – Minister of Public Health and Population
Maurice Lemaire – Minister of Reconstruction and Housing
Pierre Ferri – Minister of Posts
Edmond Barrachin – Minister of Constitutional Reform
Édouard Corniglion-Molinier – Minister of State

Changes
3 June 1954 – Édouard Frédéric-Dupont enters the ministry as Minister of Relations with Partner States.

References

1889 births
1975 deaths
People from Orne
Politicians from Normandy
Republican Centre politicians
Democratic Republican Alliance politicians
Republican Party of Liberty politicians
National Centre of Independents and Peasants politicians
Prime Ministers of France
French Ministers of Posts, Telegraphs, and Telephones
Members of the 15th Chamber of Deputies of the French Third Republic
Members of the 16th Chamber of Deputies of the French Third Republic
Members of the Constituent Assembly of France (1945)
Members of the Constituent Assembly of France (1946)
Deputies of the 1st National Assembly of the French Fourth Republic
Deputies of the 2nd National Assembly of the French Fourth Republic
Deputies of the 3rd National Assembly of the French Fourth Republic